The Rue Elzévir is a street in the part of Le Marais in the 3rd arrondissement, Paris, France.

From 1990, the Musée Cognacq-Jay has been at 8 rue Elzévir.

References

Streets in the 3rd arrondissement of Paris